Goniobranchus charlottae is a species of colourful sea slug, a dorid nudibranch, a marine gastropod mollusc in the family Chromodorididae.

Distribution
This species was described from the Red Sea. It appears to be a Red Sea endemic.

References

Chromodorididae
Gastropods described in 1999